The 1897 Currie Cup was the fourth edition of the Currie Cup, the premier domestic rugby union competition in South Africa.

See also

 Currie Cup

References

1897
1897 in South African rugby union
Currie